Sarah-Lorraine Kessel (born 15 November 1992 as Sarah-Lorraine Riek) is a German model and beauty pageant titleholder who was crowned Miss Universe Germany 2015 and represented Germany at the Miss Universe 2015 pageant.

Career
Sarah-Lorraine Riek was born in Heidenheim on 15 November 1992. She grew up in South Korea, Malaysia, Sweden and the US before her family moved to a small Bavarian village called Syrgenstein in 2001.

In 2012 Riek was crowned Miss Bavaria and competed in the Miss Germany pageant in Halle. She was awarded Miss Internet by the Miss Germany Organization, and was a contestant at the Miss Exclusive of the World.

During her reign as Miss Bavaria she worked as an ambassador and founder of an awareness and prevention project for cervical cancer in cooperation with the Euromed clinic in Fürth.

On 11 October 2015 Riek was crowned Miss Germany Universe 2015 at the DorMero Hotel in Bonn. As Miss Germany, she competed at the Miss Universe 2015 pageant held at Planet Hollywood Las Vegas on 20 December 2015.

Riek holds a degree in business and law and aspires to be a lawyer for human rights.

In 2018 Kessel married the German soccer player Benjamin Kessel.

References

External links
"Sarah-Lorraine Riek darf für Deutschland zur Miss-Universe-Wahl", Noise, 17 October 2015.
"Sarah-Lorraine Riek: Erst Model, dann Anwältin für Menschenrechte?", Heidenheimer Zeitung, 11 April 2016

Living people
1993 births
German beauty pageant winners
Miss Universe 2015 contestants
People from Heidenheim